Håkan Georg Hellström (born 2 April 1974) is a Swedish musician. He made his breakthrough in Sweden in 2000 with the song "Känn ingen sorg för mig Göteborg" and the album with the same name. He has released nine studio albums to date with eight reaching number one on the Swedish Albums Chart, while Ett kolikbarns bekännelser reached number two.

Hellström played drums in the Swedish indie pop band Broder Daniel between 1988 and 1994, then briefly for Swedish alternative rock band Honey Is Cool with Karin Dreijer from The Knife and Fever Ray. In 1997 he rejoined Broder Daniel to play the bass, until 2003 when he left the band again to focus completely on his solo career.

In 2006, following the birth of his son, he announced that he would take a break from touring and recording. Despite this, he still performed occasional gigs and continues to release very successful albums.

On 5 June 2016, he performed a concert at Ullevi Stadium in Gothenburg that set a new attendance record of 70,144 people. In the summer of 2020, he was supposed to celebrate 20 years since his first album release, by having four concerts at Ullevi Stadium. All the concert were cancelled, due to Covid-19. On 15 May 2020, Hellström released the album Rampljus Vol.1. The album peaked at number one on the Swedish Albums Chart, marking Hellström's ninth album to do so. Shortly after the release of Rampljus Vol.1, Hellström released the album Rampljus. The album contains the songs from the previous release and seven new songs.

Hellström is also known for the many complaints about his singing off key, but some music critics have defended him, calling  his voice sensitive and strained, as well as unique and gripping.

Discography

Albums 
Studio albums

Live albums

Compilation albums

Extended plays
2002: Luften bor i mina steg
2016: 1974

Singles

Other charted songs

References

External links 
  (in Swedish)
Geni profile

1974 births
Living people
Musicians from Gothenburg
Swedish-language singers
Swedish pop singers
University of Gothenburg alumni
21st-century Swedish singers
Musikförläggarnas pris winners